Clemente Domínguez y Gómez (23 May 1946 – 22 March 2005) was a self-proclaimed successor of Pope Paul VI and was recognised as Pope Gregory XVII by supporters of the Palmarian Christian Church schismatic breakaway movement in 1978. His claim was not taken seriously by mainstream Catholics, the vast majority of whom were unaware of his existence.

Domínguez was canonised on 24 March 2005 by his successor, Manuel Corral (who took the papal name "Peter II") and has subsequently been referred to by adherents of his church as "Pope Saint Gregory XVII the Very Great".

Palmar de Troya 

Clemente Domínguez y Gómez was born in Seville, Spain.

He became closely associated with the Palmar de Troya movement, which had its origins in an alleged apparition of the Blessed Virgin Mary, under the title of Our Lady of Palmar, on 30 March 1968 in El Palmar de Troya, a little village near Utrera in the Province of Seville. He claimed to have experienced visions of the Virgin Mary from 30 September 1969. He claimed that the Virgin in her messages condemned heresy and what was called progressivism, namely the reform of the Catholic Church underway as a result of Vatican II. His followers claimed he possessed the stigmata, the wounds of Jesus after crucifixion, on his hands. However, the Catholic Church cast doubts on the legitimacy of the alleged visions and apparitions.

Clemente Domínguez' claim to be the Pope of the Catholic Church remains unaccepted by Catholics, who accepted Pope John Paul I (1978) and Pope John Paul II (1978–2005) as the true successors of Pope Paul VI.

Controversially ordained 

In December 1975, Clemente Domínguez founded his own religious order, The Carmelites of the Holy Face, allegedly upon instructions from the Blessed Virgin Mary in an apparition.

Domínguez, who assumed the name Fr. Ferdinand, was ordained bishop by Roman Catholic Archbishop Pierre Martin Ngô Đình Thục in January 1976.

Archbishop Thục was subsequently excommunicated  for his ordinations, which were deemed valid but illicit. (Although Archbishop Thuc had the power to ordain he did not have the authority to do so from Pope Paul VI, which is a requirement for licit episcopal holy orders in Roman Catholicism.) Domínguez was also excommunicated latae sentientiae.

Claim to the Papacy 
In May 1976, Domínguez lost his eyeballs in a car accident. He claimed further visions, including visions from Jesus, who he claimed told him: "You shall be the Peter to come, the Pope who will consolidate the Faith and the Church in her integrity, who shall battle against heresy with great power, for legions of Angels shall assist you... me Great Pope Gregory, Glory of the Olives..." He also claimed that Christ had named him His sub-Vicar, with the automatic right of succession to the papacy after Pope Paul VI. On 6 August 1978, Pope Paul died and Domínguez claimed the papacy, proclaiming himself Pope Gregory XVII.

Domínguez claimed that he was visited by Christ, along with Saint Peter and Saint Paul, who told him

The reign of the Glory of the Olives has begun... A great day today, in which you are vested with the Office of Pope, on this feast of the Transfiguration on Mount Thabor,—Feastday of the Holy Face, of the Order of which you are the Founder and Father General. The great Pontificate of the Glory of the Olives begins: the Pope foretold by many mystics and in many prophecies; the Pope who unites in his veins the blood of Spain, the noble blood of Spain, with the true blood of France and with the blood of the chosen people, the Jewish people. There, the grandeur! He will not delay long before taking up the sword and fulfilling the mission of emperor and great monarch... It was also foretold in prophecies in past times how this Pope would be elected: namely through the direct intervention of the Apostles Saint Peter and Saint Paul. There is no other way of opposing the official election in Conclave in Rome from which the Antipope will come... Only the simple and humble of heart will recognize the true Pope: Pope Gregory XVII.

On 15 August 1978, he was crowned Pope by four of his newly created College of Cardinals in a coronation held in Seville in Spain. During his papacy, he purported to canonize Generalissimo Francisco Franco and Christopher Columbus as saints. According to his supporters, Pope Gregory XVII was destined to be the last Pope, and would be crucified and die in Jerusalem.

In the 1990s, Gregory XVII was accused of sexual impropriety with several of his priests and nuns.  In 1997 he admitted to it and begged forgiveness.
He died on 22 March 2005 in El Palmar de Troya, and was succeeded by Manuel Corral, who took the name Pope Peter II. Incidentally, the papacy of Gregory XVII closely overlapped that of Pope John Paul II.  He died, aged only 58, a mere 11 days prior to the death of his rival.

Domínguez was canonised as a saint by Corral on 24 March 2005, two days after his death. He has subsequently been referred to by adherents of the Palmarian Church as "Pope Saint Gregory XVII the Very Great". On 29 July 2005, Corral declared that Domínguez's soul did not spend time in purgatory but ascended directly to heaven.

In film
In the 1986 Spanish comedy film , Clemente is played by Ángel de Andrés López.

See also 
 Conclavism
 Sedevacantism
 Jean-Gaston Tremblay, a traditionalist Catholic from Canada who also proclaimed himself "Pope Gregory XVII"
 Siri thesis, the claim that Giuseppe Cardinal Siri was elected pope in 1958, with the name Gregory XVII

References

External links 
 Website of the Christian Palmarian Church
  Site of 'Pope Gregory XVII'
 Center For Studies on New Religions: Another Pope Dies (includes mention of the case of sexual impropriety)
 Newspaper story of his death

 

1946 births
2005 deaths
People from Seville
20th-century antipopes
21st-century antipopes
Bishops of Independent Catholic denominations
People excommunicated by the Catholic Church
Spanish religious leaders
Spanish traditionalist Catholics
Blind clergy
Spanish blind people
Thục line bishops
Marian visionaries
Antipopes
Conclavism